The Glendinning–Allan Medal, formerly the Ross Glenndinning Medal, is awarded to the player judged best on ground in each Western Derby football match played between Fremantle Football Club and the West Coast Eagles.

It is named after former Western Australian footballers Ross Glendinning, a Brownlow Medallist with North Melbourne and the inaugural captain of the West Coast Eagles, and Ben Allan, a former Hawthorn premiership player and the inaugural Fremantle captain. The medal, initially named the Ross Glendinning Medal, was first presented in 2001. In 2018, the name was changed to acknowledge both Fremantle's and West Coast's inaugural captains. Retrospective medals were also awarded to the best player from the initial 12 derbies between 1995 and 2000. The medal is voted by selection of media representatives, and joint medals are presented in the event that more than one player finishes with the equal-highest number of votes.

Fremantle's Paul Hasleby has currently won the medal 4 times, the most by any player.

Controversies 
 Round 5, 2003: The five media selectors chose Ashley Sampi as the preferred recipient, but Glendinning overruled them and awarded the medal to Michael Gardiner.
 Round 6, 2006: After Fremantle's narrow win, the medal was awarded to Chris Judd of West Coast, which attracted boos from the Fremantle fans in the crowd. Fremantle coach Chris Connolly criticised his club's supporters for the booing.
 Round 3, 2007: Michael Braun finished his acceptance speech with "Let's have a fucking good year".  He was fined $5,000 by the AFL, who overruled the $500 penalty given to him by his club.
 Round 6, 2018: The name of the medal at the time became a source of controversy due to the Fremantle Football Club's decision not to award it a week before their home derby because they felt that the name 'Ross Glendinning' alone did not reflect the club. It was later renamed the 'Glendinning–Allan Medal' after the inaugural captains of each team.

References

Fremantle Football Club
West Coast Eagles
Australian Football League awards
Awards established in 2001